Badara Ndiaye (born 31 March 1986 in Kaolack) is a Senegalese-born American and French visual artist, journalist, fashion designer, photographer, filmmaker, model, and former NCAA Division I basketball player.

Personal life
Ndiaye was born 31 March 1986 in Kaolack, Senegal. to Abdallah Ndiaye and Ndeye Ndiaye. His father is a well-known actor and a feminist. His mother is a women's rights activist. Among his siblings are two brothers. He played volleyball, football (soccer), and basketball, among other sports he enjoyed such as gymnastics. He only began playing basketball at age 17. He describes his personality while growing up as reserved, but he was a member of his school's culture club. Ndiaye was recruited to play college basketball in the United States. He learned to speak English after arriving in the U.S. He studied sociology, anthropology, and psychology at university. He has worked with the United Nations (UN) and was recognized as a cultural ambassador of Senegal by Senegalese ambassador to France, El Hadj Maguette Seye.

Ndiaye is outspoken in support of human rights for all. He particularly works to improve depictions of and the welfare of Africans, and the Senegalese people, as well as diaspora peoples in general. He supports these in his art and statements, and for better treatment of LGBTQIA+ people, especially as it concerns stereotypes and representation of Africa and homosexuality. 

Ndiaye resides primarily in Paris, France and maintains a residence in Miami Beach, Florida while traveling extensively worldwide. He learned several languages, being fluent in English, French, and Spanish, and somewhat proficient in Hebrew and some languages of Senegal.

Basketball career
Ndiaye attended secondary school at Fontiyon Tabl in Saint-Louis where he was MVP averaging seventeen points and six rebounds per game where he helped the team to a 2003 regional championship. He was discovered by an NBA program where the five best players of scores of dozens of countries are selected with which he attended a camp in South Africa. 

Ndiaye emigrated to the United States to play at Southeastern Community College (SECC) in West Burlington, Iowa from 2005 to 2007. As a Blackeye he averaged six points and four rebounds per game as a freshman and about one-and-a-half blocks per game as a sophomore, when he competed at the ICCAC Impact Sports Juco Jamboree and was recognized as a top prospect.

Ndiaye transferred to Florida International University (FIU) in University Park as a junior where he attended from 2007 to 2009 and played as a Panther. A versatile big man, he played the power forward position at SECC and center at FIU. Plying for the Panthers Ndiaye ranked second on the team with twenty-one blocked shots and performed strongly rebounding while posting solid points, steal, and assist statistics. He suffered a knee injury which required microfracture surgery during his senior year, which ended his basketball career. During this time, he transitioned as a creative producer after he was discovered by fashion photographer Prescott McDonald.

Artist and model career 
A friend introduced Ndiaye to social media and his broader career accelerated after they began working with Anna Dello Russo. He came to represent brands as a photographer, correspondent, marketer, and model. These brands and numerous and varied, prominent among these were Adidas then emerging toward luxury brands. His contributions, photography, and modeling have been featured in GQ (Spain, Australia, Italy, and Thailand), Vogue (Italy, Thailand), Elle (South Africa), The Wall Street Journal'', and Harper's Bazaar, among others. He contributed to L'Officiel Hommes and was the Men's Editor at New York Style Guide'' for several years. He worked with the Parsons School of Design and Istituto Marangoni. Ndiaye evolved to doing independent work as a visual concept developer and a creative director. He is founder and CEO of Badaraofficial and BSMLifestyle since 2014, which concentrate on men's fashion, and where videography came to prominence as he envisioned, directed, and produces short films. Now producing his own works and working with actors at shoots worldwide, he designs and physically creates his own clothes. He continues to regularly collaborate with various companies, notably established and luxury brands. He is assistant global marketing director at BellaGraph Nova Group.

External links 
 Badaraofficial Instagram
 Sports-Reference.com profile
 NJCAA profile

References 

1986 births
Living people
Senegalese men's basketball players
Power forwards (basketball)
Centers (basketball)
Senegalese expatriate basketball people in the United States
Senegalese expatriate basketball people in France
FIU Panthers men's basketball players
LGBT basketball players
Florida International University alumni
Fashion journalists
Male models
Senegalese models
African-American male models
LGBT models
Fashion photographers
Conceptual photographers
Senegalese photographers
Video artists
Menswear designers
LGBT fashion designers